Modality may refer to:

Humanities
 Modality (theology), the organization and structure of the church, as distinct from sodality or parachurch organizations
 Modality (music), in music, the subject concerning certain diatonic scales
 Modalities (sociology), a concept in Anthony Giddens' structuration theory
 Modal logic (philosophy), a form of logic which distinguishes between (logically) "necessary truths" and "contingent truths"

Linguistics
 Modality (semiotics), the channel by which signs are transmitted (oral, gesture, written)
 Modality (natural language), a system of alternative wordings in a language that construes different degrees of necessity, obligation, and probability from either a subjective or an objective perspective

Medicine
 Modality (therapy), a method of therapeutic approach
 Modality (diagnosis), a method of diagnosis
 Modality (medical imaging), acquiring structural or functional images of the body
 Stimulus modality, a type of physical phenomenon or stimulus that one can sense, such as temperature and sound
Modality Partnership, a British primary care provider

Science and technology
 Transportation modality, a mode of transport
 Modality (human–computer interaction), a path of communication between the human and the computer, such as vision or touch
 Mode (user interface), a distinct setting within a computer program or any physical machine interface
Stimulus modality, one aspect of a stimulus or what is perceived after a stimulus (e.g. light, sound, temperature, taste], pressure, or smell)

Pseudoscience
 Modality (astrology)

Other uses
 Multimedia learning
 In advance fee fraud (Nigerian 419 scams), the method of funds transfers; often used as a key-word in scam baiting
 Modal realism, the view that all possible worlds are as real as the actual world
 Extended modal realism, the view that all worlds, possible as well as impossible, are as real as the actual world
 Modalities (trade negotiations), the formulas, targets, or specific measures used to accomplish objectives in trade negotiations
 Modality (book), a 2009 book by the semanticist Paul Portner

See also
 Mode (disambiguation)
 Modal (disambiguation)